109 Herculis is a single star in the northern constellation of Hercules. It is visible to the naked eye as a faint, orange-hued point of light with an apparent visual magnitude of 3.84. The star is located around  distant, based on parallax.

This is an aging giant star with a stellar classification of K2IIIab. It is a red clump giant, meaning it on the horizontal branch and is generating energy through helium fusion at its core. The star is roughly six billion years old with slightly more mass than the Sun. With the supply of hydrogen at its core exhausted, it has expanded to nearly 12 times the Sun's radius. The star is radiating 57 times the luminosity of the Sun from its swollen photosphere at an effective temperature of 4,569 K.

This star, together with 93 Her, 95 Her, and 102 Her, were consist Cerberus, the obsolete constellation

References

K-type giants
Horizontal-branch stars
Hercules (constellation)
Durchmusterung objects
Herculis, 109
169414
090139
6895